Jeff Altenburg is a professional race car driver born in the USA. He has won sixteen national championships in both amateur and professional racing.

Personal life
Altenburg attended Catonsville High School in Baltimore County, Maryland and later attended the US Navy's Nuclear Power School.
He was married to Brenda Altenburg and has a daughter named Cloe.

Racing career
Altenburg has competed in the BF Goodrich Trans Am Series, the Neon Challenge Series, the American Le Mans Series and the GrandAm Series. He has collected more than 120 career wins and 16 championships, with a record-setting six consecutive wins in the PPG Neon Challenge championships.

Genesis Racing
1999 and 2000, Altenburg Raced with Genesis in 4 events in their Hawk MD3R and BMW M3

Tri-Point Motorsports
From 2002 until 2008 he competed in the SCCA Speed World Challenge Series racing as a Mazda Factory Driver for Tri Point Motorsports, first in their Mazda Protege Touring Cars and then in their Mazda 6 Touring Cars. In 2006, Altenburg earned six top-five finishes and three podiums and finished seventh in the Drivers' Championship. 
In 2007 Altenburg and car chief Ron Carroll won the 2007 SPEED World Challenge Championship, by first winning at Sebring and Miller Motorsports Park.

Powell Motorsport
In 2003, Altenburg joined Powell Motorsport two races into the 2003 11-race Grand AM Cup to finish the season in their #02 Rockland Standard Gear Corvette.

Rocketsport Racing 
In 2000 the racing technologies firm, Steele Racing Enterprises, Inc., headed by Robert Steele, partnered with the race team Rocketsport Racing, headed by Paul Gentilozzi, to field Altenburg as a contender for the BF Goodrich Trans Am Series and Rookie of the year. Placing 3rd in the driver's championship with four podiums including a 3rd-place finish at his very first Trans Am Start in Sebring, Florida, Altenburg was awarded Rookie of the Year for the 2000 BF Goodrich Trans Am Series.

The Rolex Rotors
The Rolex Rotors were a Go-Kart team with whom Altenburg raced with in May 2001 during the 'Three Hours of Go-Karting,' an event held as a precursor to the Six Hours of The Glen being held at Waktins Glen International. Sadly, his team did not podium.

Momentum Race Group
Altenburg joined Momentum Race Group in 2009
In 2010, Altenburg drove for Momentum Race Group in their Number 05, Camaro SS, competing in the Grand Am Continental Tire Sportscar Championship in the GS.R class.

Championship Titles
Between 1989 and 1997, 4 Solo Championships
Between 1989 and 1997, 6 Pro Solo Championships
1997 Solo Championship
1997 SCCA Runoffs Champion
1997 Neon Challenge Championships (becoming the first driver to win the Solo, Runoffs and SCCA Pro Racing National Championships (Neon Challenge) in the same year)
1998 Neon Challenge Championships
1999 SCCA Runoffs Champion
2007 SPEED World Challenge Touring Car Championship

Notable Achievements
Six Neon Challenge race wins. 
Ran the full 2000 Trans-Am Season with two seconds and two third podium finishes, finishing third in driver points. 
2001 Second place finish in the Le Mans Series at Portland, driving a Viper GTSR. 
2001 First place in the Grand Am Cup at Mosport, Sport Touring Class
2002 Second, Third, and Fifth place finishes in the SPEED World Challenge Touring Season at VIR, Road Atlanta and Trois Rivieres, respectively, finishing thirteenth in the season for driver points.
2003 sixth-place finish in the SPEED touring Car Drivers' Championship
2003 first place in the SPEED Touring Car at Mazda Raceway Laguna-Seca
2003 second-place finishes in the SPEED Touring Car Championships, at Infineon Raceway and twice at Road Atlanta
2004 first-place finish (career second) in the SPEED Touring Car at Laguna Seca
2007 first place in the SPEED Touring Car Championship at Sebring and Miller Motorsports Park
Reset the qualifying lap record at Mid-Ohio in 2007
2012 shared first place in the Motul CTMP Grand Prix Pirelli World Challenge Touring Car twin sprints at Canadian Tire Motorsport Park in No. 43

Cars
1999 No. 12 Hawk MD3R with Genesis Racing
1999 No. 32 Hawk MD3R with Genesis Racing
2000 No. 82 Dodge Viper with Michael McCann
2000 No. 55 BMW M3 with Genesis Racing
2001 No. 17 Chevret Corvette C5 with Trinkler Racing, LLC
2001 No. 45 Dodge Viper with American Viperacing
2001 No. 15 Porsche 996 GT3-RS with Fordahl Motorsports/Crazy Redhead Racing
2001 No. 56 Chrysler Viper  with Muzzy Racing
2001 No. 35 Chevrolet Corvette with Phoenix American Motorsports
2002 No. 44 Dodge Viper with American Viperacing
2003 No. 71 Dodge Viper with Carsport America
2003 No. 02 Chevrolet Corvette with Powell Motorsport
2003 No. 17 Dodge Viper with Carsport America
2003 No. 123 Porsche 996 GT3 Cup with TPC Racing
2006 No. 70 Mazda RX-8 with SpeedSource
2006 No. 21 BMW M3 E46 with Matt Connolly Motorsports
2006 No. 142 Acura RSX-S with [DavisAcura.com]
2007 No. 13 Dodge Viper for Woodhouse Performance
2008 No. 21 Pontiac GTO.R	 with Matt Connolly Motorsports
2012 No. 43 HPA/RennGruppe/Brimtek/SGRacing Volkswagen GLI

Motorsports career results

SCCA National Championship Runoffs

American open-wheel racing results
(key)

Barber Dodge Pro Series

External links

References

Living people
1962 births
People from Ellicott City, Maryland
Racing drivers from Baltimore
Racing drivers from Maryland
American Le Mans Series drivers
Rolex Sports Car Series drivers
Trans-Am Series drivers
Barber Pro Series drivers
SCCA National Championship Runoffs winners